Fanfare Ritmico is a single-movement orchestral composition by the American composer Jennifer Higdon.  The work was commissioned by The Women's Philharmonic as part of The Fanfares Project.  It was given its world premiere in March 2000 by conductor Apo Hsu and the Women's Philharmonic.

Composition
Fanfare Ritmico has a duration of roughly 6 minutes and is composed in a single movement.  Higdon conceived the piece as a celebration of the "rhythm and speed" of life, writing in the score program notes:

Instrumentation
The work is scored for an orchestra comprising three flutes (3rd doubling piccolo), three oboes, two clarinets, bass clarinet, two bassoons, contrabassoon, four French horns, three trumpets, three trombones, tuba, timpani, four percussionists, harp, piano, and strings.

Reception
Reviewing the world premiere, Joshua Kosman of the San Francisco Chronicle praised Fanfare Ritmico, remarking:
Allan Kozinn of The New York Times similarly described the piece as "tonal and flashy, with dense, demanding brass and percussion writing".  Anne Midgette called it "exuberant" and "a flourish of sound that opens by running across the percussion in the back of the orchestra, from right to left, like a stereophonic effect, and then blooms through the orchestra."  Tim Sawyier of the Chicago Classical Review also lauded the composition, writing, "The propulsive percussion section was dynamic throughout, and the trumpet and flute flourishes nimbly executed."
David Bratman of the San Francisco Classical Voice wrote:

See also
List of compositions by Jennifer Higdon

References

Compositions by Jennifer Higdon
1999 compositions
Compositions for symphony orchestra